Trama is a genus of aphids, in the order Hemiptera. They are noted for their lack of sexual reproduction.

Species
 Trama afghanica Narzikulov, 1973
 Trama antennata Mordvilko, 1935
 Trama baronii Hille Ris Lambers, 1969
 Trama bazarovi Narzikulov, 1966
 Trama caudata Del Guercio, 1909
 Trama centaureae Börner, 1940
 Trama eastopi Heinze, 1962
 Trama euphorbiae Juchnevitch & Kan, 1971
 Trama formicella Theobald, 1929
 Trama helianthemi Westwood 1843, originally Rhizobius helianthemi
 Trama kulinitschae Narzikulov, 1969
 Trama maritima Eastop, 1953
 Trama mordwilkoi or Trama mordvilkoi Börner, 1940
 Trama muchinae Kan & Folk, 1986
 Trama narzykulovi or Trama narzikulovi Kan, 1962 reclassified as Protrama narzykulovi
 Trama nigrarta Zhang, Chen, Zhong & Li, 1999)
 Trama pamirica Narzikulov, 1963 reclassified as Protrama pamirica
 Trama penecaeca Stroyan, 1964 reclassified as Protrama penecaeca
 Trama rara Mordvilko, 1908
 Trama taraxaci Shinji, 1930
 Trama troglodytes von Heyden, 1837

References
 
 
 
 

Lachninae
Sternorrhyncha genera